The mazurka (Polish: mazurek) is a Polish musical form based on stylised folk dances in triple meter, usually at a lively tempo, with character defined mostly by the prominent mazur's "strong accents unsystematically placed on the second or third beat". The mazurka, alongside the polka dance, became popular at the ballrooms and salons of Europe in the 19th century, particularly through the notable works by Frédéric Chopin. The mazurka (in Polish mazur, the same word as the mazur) and mazurek (rural dance based on the mazur) are often confused in Western literature as the same musical form.

History 
The folk origins of the mazurka are three Polish folk dances which are:

 mazur, most characteristic due to its inconsistent rhythmic accents,
 slow and melancholic kujawiak,
 fast oberek.

The mazurka is always found to have either a triplet, trill, dotted eighth note (quaver) pair, or an ordinary eighth note pair before two quarter notes (crotchets). In the 19th century, the form became popular in many ballrooms in different parts of Europe.

"Mazurka" is a Polish word, it means a Masovian woman or girl. It is a feminine form of the word "Mazur", which — until the nineteenth century — denoted an inhabitant of Poland's Mazovia region (Masovians, formerly plural: Mazurzy). The similar word "Mazurek" is a diminutive and masculine form of "Mazur". In relation to dance, all these words (mazur, mazurek, mazurka) mean "a Mazovian dance". Apart from the ethnic name, the word mazurek refers to various terms in Polish, e.g. a cake, a bird and a popular surname. 

Mazurek is also a rural dance identified by some as the oberek. It is said oberek is a danced variation of the sung mazurek, the latter also having more prominent accents on second and third beats and less fluent of a rhythmical flow, which is so characteristical of oberek.
 

Several classical composers have written mazurkas, with the best known being the 59 composed by Frédéric Chopin for solo piano.  In 1825 Maria Szymanowska wrote the largest collection of piano mazurkas published before Chopin. Henryk Wieniawski also wrote two for violin with piano (the popular "Obertas", Op. 19), Julian Cochran composed a collection of five mazurkas for solo piano and orchestra, and in the 1920s, Karol Szymanowski wrote a set of twenty for piano and finished his composing career with a final pair in 1934. Alexander Scriabin, who was at first conscious of being Chopin's follower, wrote 24 mazurkas.

Chopin first started composing mazurkas in 1824, but his composing did not become serious until 1830, the year of the November Uprising, a Polish rebellion against the Russian tsar.  Chopin continued composing them until 1849, the year of his death.  The stylistic and musical characteristics of Chopin's mazurkas differ from the traditional variety because Chopin in effect created a completely separate and new genre of mazurka all his own.  For example, he used classical techniques in his mazurkas, including counterpoint and fugue. By including more chromaticism and harmony in the mazurkas, he made them more technically interesting than the traditional dances.  Chopin also tried to compose his mazurkas in such a way that they could not be used for dancing, so as to distance them from the original form.

However, while Chopin changed some aspects of the original mazurka, he maintained others.  His mazurkas, like the traditional dances, contain a great deal of repetition: repetition of certain measures or groups of measures; of entire sections; and of an initial theme. The rhythm of his mazurkas also remains very similar to that of earlier mazurkas.  However, Chopin also incorporated the rhythmic elements of the two other Polish forms mentioned above, the kujawiak and oberek; his mazurkas usually feature rhythms from more than one of these three forms (mazurek, kujawiak, and oberek).  This use of rhythm suggests that Chopin tried to create a genre that had ties to the original form, but was still something new and different.

The mazurka began as a dance for either four or eight couples.  Eventually, Michel Fokine created a female solo mazurka dance dominated by flying grandes jetés, alternating second and third arabesque positions, and split-leg climactic postures.

Outside Poland 

The form was common as a popular dance in Europe and the United States in the mid to late nineteenth century.

Cape Verde Islands
In Cape Verde the mazurka is also revered as an important cultural phenomenon played with acoustic bands led by a violinist and accompanied by guitarists.
It also takes a variation of the mazurka dance form and is found mostly in the north of the archipelago, mainly in São Nicolau, Santo Antão. In the south it finds popularity in the island of Brava.

Czechia
Czech composers Bedřich Smetana, Antonín Dvořák, and Bohuslav Martinů all wrote mazurkas to at least some extent.  For Smetana and Martinů, these are single pieces (respectively, a Mazurka-Cappricio for piano and a Mazurka-Nocturne for a mixed string/wind quartet), whereas Dvořák composed a set of six mazurkas for piano, and a mazurka for violin and orchestra.

France
In France, Impressionistic composers Claude Debussy and Maurice Ravel both wrote mazurkas; Debussy's is a stand-alone piece, and Ravel's is part of a suite of an early work, La Parade. Jacques Offenbach included a mazurka in his ballet Gaîté Parisienne; Léo Delibes composed one which appears several times in the first act of his ballet Coppélia. The mazurka appears frequently in French traditional folk music. In the French Antilles, the mazurka has become an important style of dance and music.

A creolised version of the mazurka is mazouk which—beginning around 1979 in Paris—morphed into the globally popular dance style “zouk” developed in France and popularised by Paris's Island-creole supergroup Kassav'; mazouk had been introduced to the French Caribbean in the late 1800s. In the 21st century in Brazil and the Afro-Caribbean diaspora, zouk (and its progenitor band Kassav') remains very popular. In popular 20th century folk dancing in France, the Polish/classical-piano (see Chopin) mazurka evolved into mazouk, a dance at a more gentle pace (without the traditional 'hop' step on the 3rd beat), fostering more-intimate dancing and associating mazouk with a "seduction" dance (see also tango from Argentina). This "sexy" style of mazurka has also been imported to “balfolk" dancing in Belgium and the Netherlands, hence the name "Belgian Mazurka" or "Flemish Mazurka". Perhaps the most enduring style of intimate dancing music of this origin moved zouk from the 1980s–2000s into its wildly popular (especially in Brazil and Africa) slow-dancing variant called zouk love, which remains a staple of French-Caribbean dance venues in Paris and elsewhere.

Ireland
Mazurkas constitute a distinctive part of the traditional dance music of County Donegal, Ireland. As a couple's dance, it is no longer popular. The Polish dance entered the UK in the 1840s, but is not widely played outside of Donegal. Unlike the Polish mazurek, which may have an accent on the second or third beat of a bar, the Irish mazurka (masúrca in the Irish language) is consistently accented on the second beat, giving it a unique feel. Musician Caoimhín Mac Aoidh has written a book on the subject, From Mazovia to Meenbanad: The Donegal Mazurkas, in which the history of the musical and dance form is related. Mac Aoidh tracked down 32 different mazurkas as played in Ireland.

Italy

Mazurkas are part of Italian popular music including the Liscio style. Typical of Italian mazurkas are groups of triplets, strong dotted rhythms, and phrase endings of two accented quarter notes and a rest, unlike a waltz.

Brazil
In Brazil, the composer Ernesto Nazareth wrote a Chopinesque mazurka called "Mercedes" in 1917. Heitor Villa-Lobos wrote a mazurka for classical guitar in a similar musical style to Polish mazurkas.

Cuba
In Cuba, composer Ernesto Lecuona wrote a piece titled Mazurka en Glisado for the piano, one of various commissions throughout his life.

Nicaragua
In Nicaragua, Carlos Mejía Godoy y los de Palacaguina and Los Soñadores de Saraguasca made a compilation of mazurkas from popular folk music, which are performed with a violin de talalate, an indigenous instrument from Nicaragua.

Curaçao
In Curaçao the mazurka was popular as dance music in the nineteenth century, as well as in the first half of the twentieth century. Several Curaçao-born composers, such as Jan Gerard Palm, Joseph Sickman Corsen, Jacobo Palm, Rudolph Palm and Wim Statius Muller, have written mazurkas.

Mexico
In Mexico, composers Ricardo Castro and Manuel M Ponce wrote mazurkas for the piano in a Chopin fashion, eventually mixing elements of Mexican folk dances.

Philippines
In the Philippines, the mazurka is a popular form of traditional dance. The Mazurka Boholana is one well-known Filipino mazurka.

Portugal
In Portugal the mazurka became one of the most popular traditional European dances through the first years of the annual Andanças, a traditional dances festival held nearby Castelo de Vide.

Russia
In Russia, many composers wrote mazurkas for solo piano: Scriabin (26), Balakirev (7), Tchaikovsky (6).  Borodin wrote two in his Petite Suite for piano; Mikhail Glinka also wrote two, although one is a simplified version of Chopin's Mazurka No. 13. Tchaikovsky also included mazurkas in his scores for Swan Lake, Eugene Onegin, and Sleeping Beauty. Rachmaninoff's Morceaux de salon Op 10 includes a Mazurka in D-flat major as its 7th piece.

The mazurka was a common dance at the balls of the Russian Empire and it is depicted in many Russian novels and films. In addition to its mention in Leo Tolstoy's Anna Karenina as well as in a protracted episode in War and Peace, the dance is prominently featured in Ivan Turgenev's novel Fathers and Sons. Arkady reserves the mazurka for Madame Odintsov with whom he is falling in love.  During Russian balls, it was danced elegantly and famously by the Tsarina Maria Feodorovna, the second-to-last tsarina of the Russian empire before its collapse in 1918.

Sweden
In Swedish folk music, the quaver or eight-note polska has a similar rhythm to the mazurka, and the two dances have a common origin. The international version of the mazurka was also introduced under that name during the nineteenth century.

United States
The mazurka survives in some old-time fiddle tunes, and also in early Cajun music, though it has largely fallen out of Cajun music now.  In the Southern United States it was sometimes known as a "mazuka". Polish Mazurka was danced in upstate New York in the 1950s and 1960s (similarly to the krakowiak, millenium of Christianity) in Polish community centers or social clubs, which can be found throughout the US. The polka remains the best known dance of the Nation of Poland and its people and is regularly danced at weddings, dance halls and public events (e.g., summers outdoors, barn dances) in US.

California
In addition to being part of the repertoire of Irish traditional music sessions, the mazurka has been played by a wide variety of cultural groups in California. The mazurka first came to Alta California during the Spanish period and danced among Californios. Later, the renowned guitarist Manuel Y. Ferrer, who was born in Baja California to Spanish parents and learned guitar from a Franciscan friar in Santa Barbara but made his career in the San Francisco Bay Area, arranged mazurkas for the guitar. During the early 20th century, the mazurka became part of the repertoire of Italian American musicians in San Francisco playing in the ballo liscio style. Pianist Sid LeProtti, an important Oakland-born early jazz musician on the west coast, stated that before jazz took off, he and other musicians in Barbary Coast clubs played mazurkas in addition to waltzes, two-steps, marches, polkas, and schottisches. One mazurka, played on harmonica, was collected by Sidney Robertson Cowell for the WPA California Folk Music Project in 1939 in Tuolumne County.

See also 

 Mazur (dance)
Bourrée
 Fandango
 Ländler
 Mazurkas (Chopin)
 Polish music
 Polonaise (dance)
 Polska (dance)
 Waltz
 Pols

Notes

Bibliography 

 Downes, Stephen. "Mazurka" Grove Music Online. Oxford Music Online. 17 November 2009.
 Kallberg, Jeffrey. "The problem of repetition and return in Chopin's mazurkas." Chopin Styles, ed. Jim Samson. Cambridge, England: Cambridge University Press, 1988.
 Kallberg, Jeffrey. "Chopin's Last Style." Journal of the American Musicological Society 38.2 (1985): 264–315.
 Michałowski, Kornel, and Jim Samson. "Chopin, Fryderyk Franciszek" Grove Music Online. Oxford Music Online. 17 November 2009. (esp. section 6, "Formative Influences")
 Milewski, Barbara. "Chopin's Mazurkas and the Myth of the Folk." 19th-Century Music 23.2 (1999): 113–35.
 Rosen, Charles. The Romantic Generation. Cambridge, Massachusetts: Harvard University Press, 1995.
 Winokur, Roselyn M. "Chopin and the Mazurka". Diss. Sarah Lawrence College, 1974.

External links 

 history, description, costumes, music, sources
 Mazurka within traditional dances of the County of Nice (France)
 The Russian Mazurka
 The Mazurka Project
 *
 'Vincent Campbell's Mazurka' as played by Vincent Campbell in Co. Donegal

 
Dance forms in classical music
Irish dances
Irish music
Polish dances
Triple time dances